Cubana de Aviación S.A., commonly known as Cubana, is Cuba's flag carrier, as well as the country's largest airline. It has its corporate headquarters in Havana, and its main base is located at José Martí International Airport. Originally a subsidiary of Pan American World Airways and later a private company owned by Cuban investors, Cubana has been wholly owned by the Cuban government since May 1959.

Cubana was a founder and is a current member of the International Air Transport Association (IATA), the International Association of Aeronautical Telecommunications (SITA) and the International Association of Latin American Air Transportation (AITAL).

History

Early years to Cuban revolution

The airline was established by Clement Melville Keys on 8 October 1929 as Compañía Nacional Cubana de Aviación Curtiss S.A., initially as a flying school as well as a charter carrier, beginning scheduled services in 1930. The airline's name indicated its association with the Curtiss aircraft manufacturing company. Cubana's early fleet used Curtiss Robin, amphibian Sikorsky S-38, Ford Trimotor, and Lockheed Electra (L-10) aircraft. Pan American acquired Cubana in 1932, and the word Curtiss was deleted from the carrier's name. By the end of the decade, the carrier had a fleet of four Ford Trimotors and three Lockheed Electras that operated on the domestic Havana–Camaguey, Havana–Guantanamo–Baracoa and Santiago–Baracoa routes.

In 1944, the first International Conference on Civil Aviation was convened, which later would lead to the creation of the International Civil Aviation Organization (ICAO). Cuba was a participant in this conference and a founding member of ICAO. In April 1945, the conference that created the International Air Transport Association (IATA) was held in Havana. Cubana became a founding member of IATA, and participated in the creation of that organization through its involvement with the Havana conference and the resulting accords. Both conferences and the organizations they spawned helped establish Cubana as an internationally recognized airline company.

In May 1945 Cubana started its first scheduled international flights to Miami, using Douglas DC-3 aircraft, making the airline the first Latin American one to establish scheduled passenger services to this city. In April 1948, a transatlantic route was started between Havana and Madrid (via Bermuda, the Azores and Lisbon) using Douglas DC-4 aircraft. The Madrid route was extended to Rome in 1950. The new route to Europe made Cubana one of the earliest Latin American carriers to establish scheduled transatlantic service.

In 1953, Airwork sold Cubana three Viscount 755s in advance of delivery. Cubana was also the first Latin American airline to operate turboprop aircraft, starting in the mid-1950s with the Vickers Viscount (VV-755), which were put in service in its Miami and domestic routes, and later the Super Viscount (VV-818).

By , the carrier's fleet consisted of DC-3s and DC-4s. A year later, the strength of the fleet was 11 —six DC-3s, three Lockheed Constellations, one C-46 and one Stinson— while two Super Constellations were on order. Upon delivery of the first of these aircraft, in late 1954, the airline deployed it on the Mexico City–Madrid route. Cubana transported more than 227,000 passenger in 1955, and by that year end it had 715 employees. In , the airline ordered two Bristol Britannia 318s, intended to serve New York and Spain. An order for another two aircraft of the type was placed in mid-1958; the combined deal was worth  million.

Cuban revolution to 1980s
In May 1959, Cuba's new revolutionary government decided to take over Cubana, expropriating all its investors. The airline had expanded earlier that year its scheduled transatlantic services, adding Prague to its European route network that solely included Madrid. Having stopovers at Bermuda and the Azores, the route was flown with Bristol Britannia 318s. Cubana later sold one of its Britannias to Czechoslovak Airlines (CSA) so that this carrier could start their own Prague–Havana flights. Cubana trained CSA's personnel in the operation of the Britannias. CSA's new service started in February 1962 initially flying the Prague–Manchester–Prestwick–Havana route, and then switching to the Prague–Shannon–Gander–Havana run.

With the U.S. breaking relations (in 1961) and the imposition of the U.S. embargo on Cuba (in 1962), Cubana was forced to cancel all its U.S. services and turned to the Soviet Union to obtain new aircraft. The first Soviet-built aircraft were delivered in the early 1960s (Ilyushin Il-14 and Il-18), and were used in Cubana's domestic routes. Cubana thus became the first airline in the Americas at that time to operate Soviet-built aircraft. During the decade, the An-12 and the An-24s were also added to the fleet. Cubana's cooperation made it possible for Aeroflot to establish 18-hour non-stop scheduled services between Moscow and Havana in 1963, using Tupolev Tu-114 turboprop airliners, which were the longest non-stop flights in the world at that time. Cooperation with the East German airline Interflug also made it possible for this carrier to establish its first scheduled transatlantic services, linking East Berlin with Havana.

In  the number of employees was 1,971; at this time the carrier fleet consisted of  Antonov An-24Bs,  Britannias 318s,  C-46s,  DC-3s,  DC-4,  Il-14s and  Il-18s. Regular services to Peru, Chile, Panama, Guyana and several Caribbean destinations were started in the early and mid- 1970s. Cubana also began operating Tupolev Tu-154, Ilyushin Il-76, Yakovlev Yak-40 and Yak-42 jets in the mid-1970s. These aircraft made it possible to upgrade Cubana's domestic services and to expand or start new services to Central and South America, and to some Caribbean nations. Regular services to Canada were also started, as Cuba began to develop its tourism sector. Routes to Africa were started in the mid-1970s, serving Angola, Guinea-Bissau and Cabo Verde. Cubana subsequently ceded one of its Il-62M jets to Angola's national airline TAAG so that it could start its own Luanda-Havana flights, in cooperation with Cubana's services on that route. This allowed TAAG to start its own, first-ever transatlantic route. In the late 1970s Cubana started services to Iraq, becoming the first Latin American carrier to serve Asia, although these services were discontinued in the early 1980s.

1990s

As of March 1990, Cubana had 5,658 employees and its fleet consisted of 12 An-24RVs, 26 Antonov An-26s, four Il-18s, 11 Ilyushin Il-62Ms, two Il-76Ds, eight Tupolev Tu-154s (five Tu-154B2s and three Tu-154Ms) and 12 Yakovlev Yak-40s. At this time, the airline flew internationally to Barbados, Basle, Berlin, Bissau, Buenos Aires, Georgetown, Kingston, Lima, Luanda, Madrid, Managua, Mexico City, Montreal, Panama City, Paris and Prague; it also served a domestic network consisting of Baracoa, Camaguey, Holguin, Nicaro, Nueva Gerona, Santiago de Cuba and Tunas.

In the early 1990s, Cubana pursued a multi-faceted strategy to face the challenges posed by the dissolution of the Socialist bloc and the Soviet Union. This strategy targeted a restructuring of Cubana's fleet, the revamping of the airline's technical capabilities, and upgrading the quality of passenger services. After the early 1990s, spare parts for Cubana's Soviet-built aircraft became increasingly harder to source. Limited financial resources and lack of Western financing to replace these aircraft, coupled with restrictions imposed by the U.S. embargo on the sale of American-built aircraft and components (including engines and avionics), made it necessary to keep some of the airline's Soviet-built airplanes in service. Cubana had received its last three new Il-62Ms in late 1990 and early 1991 [along with two other (also new) similar aircraft in 1988 and 1989], and was able to keep them in service long after the Soviet Union's dissolution and the end of all Il-62 production in the mid-1990s. Cubana started leasing some Western aircraft (Airbus, Boeing) for limited periods of time in the mid-1990s, to help sustain its services to Europe, Canada and some Latin American destinations, given the rapid growth of Cuba's tourism sector.

2000s and onwards
In the early 2000s, Cubana refurbished several of its Il-62Ms to use on some of its international routes (all but one of these aircraft were removed from service in 2011), and in 2004 it embarked on a long-term renovation programme. The strategy is based on the purchase of $100 million a year in new generation Russian-built aircraft until 2012. In 2012 Cubana has completely renovated its fleet with new-generation Russian airliners. As part of its renovation strategy, Cubana has sought to upgrade its technical support capabilities. The airline established a joint venture company with Iberia Airlines of Spain in 2005, to maintain and overhaul Western-built aircraft, such as Airbus and Boeing.

In , the airline placed an order for two convertible Ilyushin Il-96-300s in a  million deal; 85% of that price was financed by a loan from Roseximbank, while Cuba's Aviaimport raised the money for the balance. In , Cubana received the first of these aircraft, becoming the first customer of the type beyond the Russian borders. In , Cuba signed another deal —worth  million this time— on behalf of Cubana for the purchase of another two Il-96-300s and three Tupolev Tu-204s. During the  MAKS Airshow Cubana signed a memorandum of understanding with Ilyushin Finance Company (IFC) for the purchase of another two Tu-204s and three Antonov An-148s. A Tu-204 freighter was never delivered to the company due to financing problems.

In , Cubana de Aviación signed a contract with IFC for the delivery of  Antonov An-158 aircraft. In , Cubana signed a deal for the order of three 350-seater Ilyushin Il-96-400s. In  the same year, Cubana received its first Antonov An-158; Cubana received another  An-158s during .

Destinations

Cubana operates flights to over 20 destinations in Cuba, Europe, the Caribbean, North, Central and South America.

Codeshare agreements
Cubana de Aviación codeshares with the following airlines:

 Aeroflot
 Air Caraïbes
 Avianca
 Avianca El Salvador
 Blue Panorama Airlines
 Neos
 Sunrise Airways

Fleet

Current fleet
, Cubana operates the following aircraft:

Former fleet
The airline operated the following aircraft all through its history:

 Antonov An-12
 Antonov An-24B
 Antonov An-24RV
 Antonov An-26
 Antonov An-26B
 Antonov An-30
 Bristol Britannia 318
 Douglas C-47A
 Douglas C-47B
 Douglas C-54A
 Ilyushin Il-14
 Ilyushin Il-18
 Ilyushin Il-62
 Ilyushin Il-62M
 Lockheed L-1049
 Lockheed L-1049E
 Lockheed L-1049G
 Tupolev Tu-154B
 Tupolev Tu-154M
 Vickers Viscount Series 810
 Vickers Viscount 755
 Yakovlev Yak-40
 Yakovlev Yak-40K
 Yakovlev Yak-42D

Accidents and incidents

See also
 List of airlines of Cuba
 Transport in Cuba
 Puertorriqueña de Aviación,  an airline that was inspired by Cubana and Mexicana de Aviación

Notes

References

External links

 
 Sol Y Son - Cubana Airlines Inflight Magazine

 
Airlines of Cuba
Government-owned airlines
Airlines established in 1929
1929 establishments in Cuba
Latin American and Caribbean Air Transport Association
Cuban brands
Government-owned companies of Cuba